Aake is a given name. Notable people with the name include:

 Aake Kalliala (born 1950), Finnish actor
 Aake Anker Ording (1899–1979), Norwegian civil servant and politician

See also
 Aage
 Aake (film),  Indian film